Winnipeg—Birds Hill was a federal electoral district in Manitoba, Canada, that was represented in the House of Commons of Canada from 1979 to 1988.

This riding was created in 1976 from parts of Selkirk and St. Boniface ridings. It was contested at federal elections in 1979, 1980, and 1984. For its entire history, its Member of Parliament was Bill Blaikie.

Boundary redistribution in 1987 abolished Winnipeg—Birds Hill: most of its territory outside the city of Winnipeg was put in Provencher and Selkirk ridings, while all of its territory in Winnipeg and a smaller portion outside went to Winnipeg Transcona. Blaikie continued to represent Winnipeg Transcona under that name, and later the name of Elmwood—Transcona, from the 1988 federal election until he retired from Parliament in 2008.

Election results

See also

 List of Canadian electoral districts
 Historical federal electoral districts of Canada

External links
 

Former federal electoral districts of Manitoba